Berino is a census-designated place in Doña Ana County, New Mexico, United States. As of the 2010 census, its population was 1,441. The village of Berino is populated to 98% by Hispanics.

The church of the small New Mexican community is called the Mission de la Inmaculada Concepción.

Demographics

References

Census-designated places in Doña Ana County, New Mexico
Census-designated places in New Mexico